Oxford is an unincorporated community and census-designated place (CDP) located within Oxford Township in Warren County, New Jersey, United States, that was created as part of the 2010 United States Census. As of the 2010 Census, the CDP's population was 1,090.

Geography
According to the United States Census Bureau, the CDP had a total area of 0.694 square miles (1.798 km2), including 0.689 square miles (1.785 km2) of land and 0.005 square miles (0.014 km2) of water (0.76%).

Demographics

Census 2010

Census 2000
As of the 2000 United States Census there were 2,283 people, 878 households, and 611 families living in the CDP. The population density was 167.9/km2 (434.6/mi2). There were 930 housing units at an average density of 68.4/km2 (177.0/mi2). The racial makeup of the CDP was 96.54% White, 1.23% African American, 0.22% Native American, 0.53% Asian, 0.66% from other races, and 0.83% from two or more races. Hispanic or Latino of any race were 3.50% of the population.

There were 878 households, out of which 37.1% had children under the age of 18 living with them, 58.2% were married couples living together, 6.5% had a female householder with no husband present, and 30.4% were non-families. 26.4% of all households were made up of individuals, and 12.1% had someone living alone who was 65 years of age or older. The average household size was 2.60 and the average family size was 3.18.

In the CDP the population was spread out, with 27.5% under the age of 18, 4.9% from 18 to 24, 36.0% from 25 to 44, 20.3% from 45 to 64, and 11.3% who were 65 years of age or older. The median age was 36 years. For every 100 females, there were 97.3 males. For every 100 females age 18 and over, there were 95.2 males.

The median income for a household in the CDP was $53,281, and the median income for a family was $64,375. Males had a median income of $45,833 versus $31,210 for females. The per capita income for the CDP was $23,563. About 2.6% of families and 4.0% of the population were below the poverty line, including 2.1% of those under age 18 and 8.1% of those age 65 or over.

Points of interest
 Oxford Furnace
 Shippen Manor

References

Census-designated places in Warren County, New Jersey
Oxford Township, New Jersey